Vihal is a village in the Karmala taluka of Solapur district in Maharashtra state, India.

Demographics
Covering  and comprising 355 households at the time of the 2011 census of India, Vihal had a population of 1590. There were 833 males and 757 females, with 185 people being aged six or younger.

References

Villages in Karmala taluka